Afternoon Records is a record label based in Minneapolis, Minnesota. The label was founded by Ian Anderson and Michael M. Sandstedt in 2003, the year Anderson graduated from high school. He wanted to create a platform for his high school band Aneuretical and others.  Afternoon Records is distributed by Warner Music Group.

Ian Anderson's own band One for the Team was on the label.

Bands

Current bands

Bad Bad Hats
Dolfish
John Vanderslice
One for the Team
Poison Control Center
Pomegranates
Sissy Wish
Tarlton
Ten Centuries
We All Have Hooks For Hands
Yellow Ostrich
Volcanoes
Statistics

Past bands

A Night In The Box
A False Notion
Aneuretical
The Battle Royale
The Coast
Crescent Moon is in Big Trouble
Ela
God Damn Doo Wop Band
Haley Bonar
Hello Blue
I, Colossus
Kurmudgeon
Linus
Look Down
Mouthful of Bees
Night Moves
Now, Now
The Plagarists
Red Fox Grey Fox
Spiritual Mansions
Squareshooters
Superdanger
Target Market
Topwise
Towers Thick Walls
Viceburgh
The Wars of 1812
We Shot The Moon
Young Dudes

Discography
AR075 The Poison Control Center - Stranger Ballet (06/07/2011)
AR074 Dolfish - Your Love Is Bummin' Me Out (June 2011)
AR073 We All Have Hooks for Hands - Girls EP
AR072 Yellow Ostrich - The Mistress
AR071 Pomegranates - One of Us
AR070 The Poison Control Center - Sad Sour Future
AR069 Tarlton - Evergreens
AR068 One for the Team - Hard for You
AR067 One for the Team - Ghosts
AR066 Ten Centuries - White Pines
AR065 Afternoon Records - Autumn Mixtape 2009
AR064 We Shot the Moon - A Silver Lining
AR063 We Shot the Moon - The Bright Side
AR062 John Vanderslice - Pixel Revolt (Vinyl Reissue)
AR061 John Vanderslice - Cellar Door (Vinyl Reissue)
AR060 John Vanderslice - Life and Death of an American Fourtracker (Vinyl Reissue)
AR059 John Vanderslice - Time Travel Is Lonely (Vinyl Reissue)
AR058 We All Have Hooks for Hands - The Shape of Energy
AR057 Sissy Wish - Beauties Never Die
AR056 Target Market - Up on the Moon
AR055 Mouthful of Bees - Mouthful of Bees
AR054 The Coast - Expatriate
AR053 One for the Team - Build a Garden EP
AR052 Tarlton - The Papa These EP
AR051 Aneuretical - When You Were A Kid (reissue)
AR050 Hail On - A compilation celebrating the release of 50 records, 2003–2008
AR049 The Poison Control Center - Make Love a Star EP
AR048 Now, Now Every Children - Cars
AR047 Spiritual Mansions - Touched
AR046 The Poison Control Center - Give It a Try/When the World Sleeps 7"
AR045 One for the Team - Build It Up
AR044 Haley Bonar - Big Star
AR043 A Night in the Box - Write a Letter
AR042 Now, Now Every Children - In the City EP
AR041 The Wars of 1812 - Status Quo Ante Bellum
AR040 Crescent Moon Is In Big Trouble - Crescent Moon Is in Big Trouble EP
AR039 Now, Now Every Children - Not One, But Two EP
AR038 The Battle Royale - Wake Up, Thunderbabe
AR037 I, Colossus - I, Colossus
AR036 The Poison Control Center - A Collage of Impressions
AR035 Young Dudes - Young Dudes LP
AR034 The Poison Control Center - Glory Us EP
AR033 Spiritual Mansions - Give Us Your Hearts
AR032 We All Have Hooks For Hands - The Pretender
AR031 Mouthful of Bees - The End
AR030 Ela - Real Blood on Fake Trees
AR029 Target Market - No Thrills
AR028 Haley Bonar - Lure the Fox
AR027 A Night in the Box - The Hustle, The Prayer, The Thief
AR026 The Battle Royale - Sparkledust Fantasy
AR025 The God Damn Doo Wop Band - Broken Hearts
AR024 The Squareshooters - I Am the Keeper
AR023 Aneuretical - Million Dollar Man
AR022 One for the Team - Good Boys Don't Make Noise
AR021 The Plagiarists - Veto!
AR020 Viceburgh - Intense Excitement
AR019 Superdanger - Fight Fight Fight
AR018 Linus - Championships are won in the off-season
AR017 The Squareshooters - ...Get Kick Out of High School
AR016 Look Down - 24/7 Dance Force
AR015 Hello Blue - What It Takes to Wake Up
AR014 Towers Thick Walls - Towers Thick Walls
AR013 Superdanger - Superdanger (EP)
AR012 A False Notion - Somewhere Between Sleep and Awake
AR011 Aneuretical - When You Were a Kid
AR010 Kurmudgeon - Cables & Ties
AR009 Look Down - The American Hustle (EP)
AR008 Afternoon Records Compilation
AR007 Aneuretical - Albumone
AR006 The New Renaissance - The Sting of Revolution
AR005 Nero - Nero
AR004 Peace, Love & The Common Cold - Tanning in the Headlights (EP)
AR003 Aneuretical - Can You Sleep Without Waking Up (EP)
AR002 Topwise - Topwise (EP)
AR001 The Genepicks - Weekend at Genepicks

See also
 List of record labels

References

External links
 Roberts, Chris, "On the run with Ian Anderson", Minnesota Public Radio, November 12, 2006.
 Afternoon Records official website
 Afternoon Records on MySpace

Record labels established in 2003
American independent record labels
Independent record labels based in Minnesota
Indie rock record labels